The Ruger Redhawk is a DA/SA, large-frame revolver that was first introduced in 1979 by Sturm, Ruger & Company. Made from high-grade steel, it is available in a stainless steel finish. The Redhawk is reinforced to handle extra stress, making it very popular for use by handloaders as it is able to handle both .45 Colt and .44 Magnum loads.  In addition, the cylinder itself is longer than most competitors', allowing ammunition to be loaded to a longer overall length. This allows for either increased powder capacity, heavier (and therefore longer) bullets without compromising the powder load, or a combination of both. Custom ammunition manufacturers even have loads made specifically for Ruger revolvers that cannot fit in shorter chambers or revolvers of weaker construction (such as the Smith & Wesson Model 29). This makes the Redhawk popular as a bear defense gun among hunters and trappers.

Design and construction
The Redhawk was the first large-bore double-action revolver made by Ruger. It was designed by Harry Sefried, who previously worked for High Standard Manufacturing Company, where he designed the High Standard Sentinel revolver.  The grip profile of the Sentinel was used on the "Six" line of Ruger .357 double-action revolvers, which included the Ruger Security-Six and its variants, the Service-Six and Speed-Six.  These revolvers were produced from 1970 to 1988, and were unlike other double-action revolvers in that they used a one-piece frame, rather than a removable sideplate, which lent them superior strength.  The Redhawk, introduced in 1980, was a scaled-up and improved version of the Security-Six, the target model, with a square butt grip, adjustable sights, and 5.5- and 7.5-inch barrel lengths.  The Redhawk was available in blued or stainless steel, and was primarily used by handgun hunters.  The Redhawk, designed for long-term use with the heaviest .44 Magnum loads, included a new latch at the crane, to firmly lock the cylinder at front and rear, a feature last seen in the Smith & Wesson's triple lock design, discontinued in 1915.

The Ruger Redhawk uses modern coil springs design instead of old-fashioned leaf springs that are found in most modern revolvers.  The revolvers also used a single spring for both the hammer and the trigger, and this meant that the force required to pull the trigger was higher than similar offerings from other manufacturers, and there was no way to adjust or correct this as it was inherent in the single-spring design.

The revolver has forward ramp sights with four different interchangeable sight inserts. The rear sights are fully adjustable, featuring a white outline. The Redhawk is available with scope mounts and rings.

The Redhawk holds six rounds of ammunition in its cylinder and until recently was available with a 4-inch, 5.5-inch, or 7.5-inch barrel. A 4.2-inch barrel was also recently added to accommodate the Canadian rules for minimum barrel length (the same was later done for the GP100 revolver). When introduced it was only offered in .44 Magnum/.44 Special. Later on .41 Magnum, .357 Magnum/.38 Special, .45 Colt, and .45 ACP/.45 Colt were added to the lineup. Gradually options in chambering were pared down, and by 2007 the Redhawk was again only offered in .44 Magnum. However, in 2008 Sturm, Ruger & Co. once again began marketing the Redhawk in .45 Colt chambering.

In June 2015 Ruger announced a production Redhawk version that supports both the rimmed .45 Colt round and the rimless .45 ACP round., Ruger achieves this multi-cartridge functionality by partially machining the cylinder for use of moon clips for the .45 ACP while still retaining enough ledge on the cylinder to allow proper .45 Colt headspacing., For several years gunsmiths have been customizing DA/SA revolver cylinders (manufactured using modern metallurgy) of .45 Colt, .454 Casull or .460 S&W Magnum chamberings to accept .45 ACP (and possibly other calibers) with moon clips in addition to the revolver's original round(s).  However, Ruger's .45 ACP/.45 Colt Redhawk offering is one of the first factory-produced, manufacturer-standard revolver models with such a machined cylinder.

Success
Despite plans to drop the line with the introduction of the Ruger Super Redhawk, the  Redhawk (with the barrel thread lubricant issue corrected) remains in production today.  Many shooters prefer the more classic lines of the Redhawk, especially those who do not plan to use a scope.

The explorer Sir Ranulph Fiennes carried a Redhawk on the 14-month-long Transglobe Expedition and used it to ward off a polar bear.

Design modification 

During the mid-1980s, Ruger began to have reports of failures in the Redhawk revolvers.  Some Redhawks were reported to be separating at the junction between barrel and frame.  It was not known at the time why this was happening; the Redhawk had been on the market for years with no reported problems, but Ruger decided to address the issue by extending the frame 2.5 inches past the cylinder face, all the way to the end of the ejector rod, to provide a massive surface into which to thread the barrel.  The extended frame also provided enough length to allow scope bases to be mounted on the frame, rather than on the barrel as was done on the scoped versions of the Redhawk.  It was determined that the barrel separations on the Redhawks were due to a change in the lubricant used when attaching the barrels to the frames, but by that time the new Super Redhawk design was already well underway and the extended frame was kept.

References

Footnotes

External links
History and Disassembly instructions of the Ruger Redhawk
Ruger Four-Inch .44 Magnum Stainless Redhawk
Manual

Ruger revolvers
Weapons and ammunition introduced in 1979
.357 Magnum firearms
.44 Magnum firearms
.45 ACP revolvers
.45 Colt firearms